Gheorghe Arpentin (born 1961) is a Moldovan politician.

He has been a member of the Parliament of Moldova since 2010. He is also co-owner of Les Terres Noires with Nicolas Dirand. Arpentin is one of the most well-known wine-makers and wine-growers in Moldova. He holds a Ph.D. in technical sciences and owns his own vineyards.
Mr. Arpentin has taken wine-making classes in France, where he lived for some time. He founded a wine consulting business in 1997. Ten years later, Mr. Arpentin was elected to head the Oenologists' Union of Moldova. He is also a member of the main wine-makers' and wine-growers' association in the United States.

External links 
 Curtea Constitutionala a validat mandatele a opt noi deputati
 Site-ul Parlamentului Republicii Moldova

References

1961 births
Living people
Democratic Party of Moldova MPs
Moldovan MPs 2009–2010